Up 'til Dawn is a nationwide student-led, student-run program in which college students raise funds for and awareness of St. Jude Children's Research Hospital.  Though called Up ’til Dawn, the program itself usually takes place throughout the academic year and provides opportunities in leadership for students, allowing them to gain valuable work experience by organizing and participating in fund-raising activities.  The program strengthens the campus community by encouraging faculty, staff and surrounding community residents to participate in the arranged fund-raising campaigns and awareness days.

Up 'til Dawn's finale event attempts to unite the entire campus and surrounding community to acknowledge their achievements and honor patients at St. Jude, an event at which students stay “Up ‘til Dawn,” using the motto “Fight the yawn-stay awake to cure childhood cancer.”
The students’ motto is “cancer doesn’t sleep, so neither should we.”   The program is called “Up ‘til Dawn” to symbolize the countless nights that parents stay up with their sick children. The Up ‘til Dawn organization is hosted by more than 180 colleges nationwide.

St. Jude Children’s Research Hospital is a world leader in the research of catastrophic childhood diseases and freely shares all of their research with hospitals around the world so that children can receive the same treatment near their home as they would receive in Memphis.

References

External links
 St. Jude Research Hospital Website
 Up 'til Dawn Website

St. Jude Children's Research Hospital
Student organizations in the United States